The 2003 William Hill Greyhound Derby took place during May and June with the final being held on 28 June 2003 at Wimbledon Stadium.

The final resulted in the disqualification of Droopys Hewitt trained by Andy Iaonnou a first season trainer and former head man to Nick Savva. A sample taken by the stewards (the usual practice) in the third round was tested as positive and after a six-month court battle the National Greyhound Racing Club stewards finally prevailed and stripped the Derby title from Droopys Hewitt and awarded it to second place Farloe Verdict. The winner Farloe Verdict received £75,000.

Final result 
At Wimbledon (over 480 metres):

Distances 
¾, short head, 3¼, head (lengths)
The distances between the greyhounds are in finishing order and shown in lengths. One length is equal to 0.08 of one second.

Competition report
 Wimbledon Stadium underwent £70,000 track improvements following public criticism during and after the 2002 English Greyhound Derby.

The first round consisted of 34 heats and ante-post favourite Top Savings justified his odds by going fastest with a 28.40 win. Micks Mystic the Scottish Derby champion was a notable elimination. Top Savings was fastest again in round two on slower going recording 28.89 beating Larkhill Bullet. Farloe Verdict and Droopys Corleone remained unbeaten. Top Savings was denied a third successive fastest round time by stayer Maxie Rumble. The Prestige champion went ten spots faster in 28.79 sec. Droopys Corleone won again but Farloe Verdict lost his unbeaten record when finishing runner up to Top Savings with Larkhill Bullet in third.

In the quarter-final Man of Cash won his third successive race in a fast 28.53 from Farloe Verdict. Droopys Corleone won heat two before Droopys Hewitt defeated Top Savings in the third quarter. Larkhill Bullet claimed the fourth and final heat. In the first semi-final Top Savings beat Farloe Pocket and Droopys Hewitt in 28.64. Droopys Corleone and Maxie Rumble failed to make the final. Larkhill Bullet claimed the easier semi-final from Farloe Verdict and Man of Cash.

In the final Man of Cash was first to show but moved off allowing Droopys Hewitt inside at the first bend, kennelmates Larkhill Bullet and Top Savings clashed putting paid to their chances and first bend bunching left Droopys Hewitt clear to win. Farloe Verdict and Top Savings both ran on well. Droopys Hewitt was subsequently disqualified following a positive drugs test and stripped of the title and prize money.

Quarter finals

Semi finals

See also
2003 UK & Ireland Greyhound Racing Year

External links
Greyhound Board of Great Britain
Greyhound Data

References

Greyhound Derby
English Greyhound Derby